Schafreuter or Schafreiter is a mountain at the border of Bavaria, Germany and Tirol, Austria in the Karwendel range.

Alpinism 
The Schafreiter is a popular destination both in summer for hiking and winter for ski tours. A common hiking access is from the south side via Tölzer hut. Another route is from the north ridge from Moosenalm.

Gallery 

Mountains of Bavaria
Mountains of the Alps